University of Wisconsin–Stevens Point (UWSP) Albertson Center for Learning Resources (also known as the UWSP LRC) is a public academic library located on the UWSP campus in Stevens Point, Wisconsin. It services UWSP students, faculty, and citizens of the city.

Background
The UWSP LRC was built in 1970, and an addition to the building was built in 1986, which increased the usable square feet from 60,000 to 133,000. The library's lobby was remodeled in 2002 and there have been multiple changes throughout the library since that time.

In 2002 the last renovation was completed to the library, in which the Museum of Natural History was expanded, the reference room was remodeled, a staircase was built between the first and second floor, and a new classroom was added.
In 2006 the Food for Thought Café was added to the after hours area on the first floor.
The UWSP LRC provides many services to students and public patrons, including: Tutoring and Learning Center, Center for Academic Excellence and Student Engagement, Assistive Technology, Wisconsin Center for Environmental Education (WCEE), Peace Institute, Food for Thought Café, Natural History Museum and selected IT (Information Technology) services.

The LRC has a diverse collection, which includes books, journals, archives, special collections, government documents, reference materials, media, manuscripts, realia, microfilm/fiche, scores, and maps.
The library currently houses a collection of 2,014,546 titles and volumes. This collection can be found among the six above ground floors.

The library is open 104 hours a week during the fall and spring semesters, and has extensive library hours for the summer. The library is also a depository for government documents, both state and national.

City
The UWSP LRC is located in the city of Stevens Point. Stevens Point is located in central Wisconsin, in Portage County, midway between Milwaukee and Minneapolis; on the Wisconsin River. This city has a population of 25,000, with a surrounding area population of 62,000. The city covers 16.8 square miles.

University
The University of Wisconsin - Stevens Point is a four-year public university that is part of the UW system. UWSP was founded in 1894 as a Teacher's College and now has over 48 majors and 78 minors for undergraduates. UWSP has 12 graduate programs and one doctorate program, in cooperation with The University of Wisconsin, Madison. UWSP employs over 400 faculty and teaching academic and staff. The student to faculty ratio is 22:1.

Governance

Staff organizational structure
This organizational chart shows all librarians as having equal status and equal power. The organization chart has a "flat structure" and all librarians who are not classified or academic staff have faculty status. Faculty librarians in the LRC have to have both an MLS master's degree and a subject area master's degree to be considered for tenure.

Despite the flat structure of the organization chart, it does show certain classes of librarians. At the top of the chart is the director and underneath is the faculty. Beneath the faculty are the academic staff followed by the classified staff and then the limited term employees. Academic staff, however, have no status over classified staff. Classified staff and academic staff are all supervised by the faculty in one form or another.

Collection development
Every year, each academic department on campus has assigned funds for purchasing books. A faculty librarian is a liaison between the departments and the library. Each faculty librarian assists the department in picking out and purchasing books for the year. The librarians will usually work with a department they're familiar with or a subject they studied (grad or undergrad) in college.

Special collections
The LRC houses some unique collections and most of them can be found on the 6th floor of the building in the government documents area.

Native American (NA) Collection: This collection features many one-of-a-kind documents and books related to Native American tribes in Wisconsin. This collection is housed on the 6th floor and maintained by the government documents staff.

Assassination Collection: This collection was created by David R. Wrone, in cooperation with the library staff. Wrone is an emeritus history professor at UWSP. This collection focuses on the Kennedy assassination documents, and it is unique in its organization.

Rare Books: This collection is housed on the 6th floor and maintained by the government documents staff and assisted by professors in the History department.

Associated departments
WCEE: The Wisconsin Center for Environmental Education (WCEE) is a department in the library that houses books on K-12 environmental education. It assists in the development, dissemination, implementation and evaluation of teacher and student K-12 Environmental Education programs. UWSP is recognized throughout the state for having these resources. The WCEE is unique, with its own interlibrary Loan department and system of checking out books. The Center is housed on the 3rd floor and has its own staff. You can find more information on the WCEE here: The Wisconsin Center for Environmental Education

WIPCS: The Wisconsin Institute for Peace and Conflict Studies (WIPCS) on the second floor of the library is the headquarters of the institute, which “is a unique and vital consortium of private and public colleges and universities dedicated to enriching academic and public discourse on issues of peace and conflict.” The LRC hosts the WIPCS office headquarters, its website, and entire collection.

Information Literacy and Bibliographic Instruction
The LRC, like many libraries, has an actual library resource course taught by faculty librarians. At UWSP this course is called Library Resources 101, and it is specifically for students on campus.

Information Literacy
The course is designed to instruct students on how to use and benefit from the library's resources. There are numerous sections, which are offered each academic semester, and occasionally during the summer terms. This is a one credit elective course. It can be taken online or in person at the library.

Bibliographic Instruction (BI)
Throughout the fall, spring, and summer semesters, informal BI sessions are taught in the LRC. They are taught by faculty librarians on an "on demand basis."

Public services

Community patrons

Community patrons are allowed to use the LRC, but are restricted to certain areas and are instructed to follow specific rules. Non-university borrowers may check out stack's books for four weeks. They are allowed one renewal of the book for an additional four weeks.

Student and faculty services

Loan periods

Undergraduates may check out stacks books for four weeks. They are allowed one renewal of the book for an additional four weeks. Graduate students may also check out books for four weeks, however, they are allowed unlimited renewals if there is no hold on the material they wish to renew.

Faculty
Faculty are allowed to check out books for an entire term and are allowed renewals after that time period.

References

External links
 

University of Wisconsin–Stevens Point